Doug Hamilton may refer to:

 Doug Hamilton (soccer) (1963–2006), president and general manager of the Los Angeles Galaxy
 Doug Hamilton (rower) (born 1958), Canadian rower

See also 
 Dougie Hamilton (born 1993), Canadian ice hockey defenceman

 Douglas Hamilton (disambiguation)